Laila Dåvøy (born 11 August 1948, in Bergen) is a Norwegian nurse and politician for the Christian Democratic Party. She is a former member of the Norwegian parliament and a former Minister and leader of the Norwegian Nurses' Union.

Career 

Dåvøy was a member of the executive committee of Askøy municipal council from 1983 to 1987. From 1987 to 1991 she was a deputy member of Hordaland county council.

From 1989 to 1990, during the cabinet Syse, Dåvøy was appointed personal secretary (today known as political advisor) in the Ministry of Culture and Church Affairs. From August to November 1990 she was State Secretary in the same ministry.

A nurse by education, Davøy was the leader of the Norwegian Nurses' Union 1992 - 1998.

In 1999 she was appointed Norwegian Minister of Labour and Administration in the first cabinet Bondevik, an office she left when the cabinet fell in 2000. From 2001 to 2005, when the second cabinet Bondevik held office, Dåvøy was Norwegian Minister of Children and Family Affairs.

She was elected to the Norwegian Parliament from Hordaland in 2005 and re-elected in 2009. She did not seek reelection to the parliament in 2013.

Personal life 
Dåvøy lives in Askøy, is married and has three children.

References

1948 births
Living people
Members of the Storting
Government ministers of Norway
Ministers of Children, Equality and Social Inclusion of Norway
Christian Democratic Party (Norway) politicians
Norwegian Christians
Hordaland politicians
Norwegian state secretaries
University of Bergen alumni
Women government ministers of Norway
People from Askøy
21st-century Norwegian politicians
21st-century Norwegian women politicians
Women members of the Storting
Norwegian women state secretaries